Luduga is a village and ward in Wanging'ombe District in the Njombe Region of the Tanzanian Southern Highlands.

In 2016 the Tanzania National Bureau of Statistics report there were 9,587 people in the ward, from 11,947 in 2012.

References

Wards of Iringa Region